The 2010 Four Continents Figure Skating Championships was an international figure skating competition in the 2009–10 season. It was held at the Hwasan Ice Arena in Jeonju, South Korea on January 27–30. Medals were awarded in the disciplines of men's singles, ladies' singles, pair skating, and ice dancing.

Qualification
The competition was open to skaters from a non-European member nation of the International Skating Union. The countries that were eligible to send skaters to the competition were Argentina, Australia, Brazil, Canada, China, Chinese Taipei, DPR Korea, Hong Kong, India, Japan, Kazakhstan, Mexico, Mongolia, New Zealand, Philippines, Puerto Rico, Republic of Korea, Singapore, South Africa, Thailand, United States of America, and Uzbekistan. The corresponding competition for European skaters was the 2010 European Figure Skating Championships.

Unlike the other three ISU championships, each nation was allowed to enter 3 skaters/couples in each event, regardless of its skaters performance in the previous year's championships. Skaters must have reached the age of 15 by July 1, 2009 in order to compete.

Schedule
All times are Korea Standard Time (UTC+9).

 Wednesday, January 27
 11:20 Ice dancing – Compulsory dance
 13:30 Pairs – Short program
 15:45 Opening ceremony
 16:30 Ladies – Short program
 Thursday, January 28
 12:00 Ice dancing – Original dance
 14:20 Pairs – Free skating
 17:30 Men – Short program
 Friday, January 29
 13:00 Ladies – Free skating
 18:00 Ice dancing – Free dance
 Saturday, January 30
 11:00 Men – Free skating
 17:00 Gala exhibition

Results

Men

Ladies

Pairs

Ice dancing

References

External links
 
 
 
 ISU Media Guide PDF

Four Continents Figure Skating Championships
Four Continents
Four Continents
Four Continents
Sports competitions in Jeonju